The Euskotren 300 series is an electric multiple unit (EMU) train type operated by Euskotren in the Basque Country, Spain from 1990 to 2018.

History
The 12 trains were delivered to Euskotren in 1990. They were built by CAF, with the exception of the non-driving cars of the 308 to 312 units, which were built by Babcock & Wilcox. They substituted the 3500 series trains on the Topo line. Due to the number of tunnels on that line, the trains were equipped with an emergency exit on the front.

Three of the trains (310, 311 and 312) were used on Euskopullman services. The Euskopullman was a limited express service that run from Bilbao to Hendaye from 1998 to 1999. The trains operating it had less seats, and they were fitted with tables and a bar. They were the only trains in Euskotren's fleet equipped with toilets until 2008, when some 200 series trains had toilets installed.

After the opening of the Bilbao metro in 1995, 200 series trains were gradually introduced on the Topo line. Thus, 300 series EMUs were relocated to the Urdaibai and Txorierri lines.

After the introduction of the 950 series in 2016, 300 series trains have been retired. That EMU has been preserved by the Basque Railway Museum, while the rest have been scrapped.

Formations

Each trainset was formed by a motored car and a non-powered car. Usually, two EMUs were coupled together into four-car sets; although coupling three EMUs was also possible.

See also
 Euskotren rolling stock

References

External links
 

Electric multiple units of Spain
300 series
CAF multiple units
Train-related introductions in 1990
1500 V DC multiple units